The Schock 41 Grand Prix is an American sailboat that was designed by William E. Cook as a International Offshore Rule (IOR) racer and first built in 1983.

Production
The design was built by W. D. Schock Corp in the United States, from 1983 until 1985, with five boats completed, but it is now out of production.

Design
The prototype was raced in the 1984 Southern Ocean Racing Conference (SORC) with a crew that included builder Tom Schock and the designer, William E. Cook. Experience from those races was used to refine the design for production. The intention was to create a less-expensive, production, high performance IOR racing boat in a field that was at that time dominated by custom-built boats.

The Schock 41 is a racing keelboat, built predominantly of fiberglass,  with a Baltek CK-57 balsa core in the hull and deck for lightness, and with wood trim. It has a masthead sloop rig, a raked stem, a reverse transom, an internally mounted spade-type rudder controlled by a tiller and a fixed fin keel. It displaces  and carries  of lead ballast.

The design has sleeping accommodation for six people, with two straight settee berths in the main cabin, two pilot berths above and two pipe berths under the cockpit. The galley is located on the port side just forward of the companionway ladder. The galley is "L"-shaped and is equipped with a stove, ice box and a sink. A navigation station is opposite the galley, on the starboard side. The engine cover box provides a mount for the drop-leaf table, with space for eight people. The cabin sole is teak and holly. The head is located in the bow on the port side.

Operational history
In a 1984 review for Yachting, Chris Caswell noted, "the Schock 41 Grand Prix is delivered with an extensive inventory of equipment, including 14 Barient winches, spinnaker pole and reaching strut, Navtec hydraulics, Martec folding prop, and Kevlar sheets. Post-SORC changes have dropped the IOR rating to 31.5, making the boat highly competitive."

See also
List of sailing boat types

References

Keelboats
1980s sailboat type designs
Sailing yachts
Sailboat type designs by William E. Cook
Sailboat types built by W. D. Schock Corp